Bangladesh–Nigeria relations refer to the bilateral relations between Bangladesh and Nigeria. Bangladesh has an embassy in Abuja. Nigeria had an embassy in Dhaka but is now closed. Nigeria is represented by a non resident ambassador in New Delhi. Both Bangladesh and Nigeria are members of international organizations including the Organisation of Islamic Cooperation and Developing 8 Countries.

High level visits 
In 2010, Prime Minister of Bangladesh Sheikh Hasina paid an official visit to Abuja.

Cooperation 
Trade and investment, agriculture and tourism are chief areas for cooperation between the two countries.

Economic relations 
Bangladesh and Nigeria have expressed mutual interest to expand bilateral trade and investment. Bangladeshi pharmaceuticals, knitwear, cement, jute and jute goods, ceramics, ocean-going vessels, light engineering, leather and plastic goods have been identified as products with huge potential in the Nigerian market. Nigeria has urged Bangladeshi businessmen to invest in the agriculture, food-processing, pharmaceuticals, medical equipments, ICT and education sectors of Nigeria. Trade between the two countries stood at US$14 million in 2012. In 2014, Bangladesh Tariff Commission prepared a feasibility study for the benefits of signing new Free/Preferential trade agreements with African states and recommended that Nigeria along with Mali are the most promising countries for signing such agreements.

Sports 
Nigerian footballer Eleta Kingsley is a known figure in Bangladesh club leagues. He was to be playing for Bangladesh national football team after getting Bangladeshi nationality, but could not due to non-approval from AFC.

See also  
 Foreign relations of Bangladesh
 Foreign relations of Nigeria

References 

 
Nigeria
Bilateral relations of Nigeria